The Dynamo Stadium is a multi-purpose stadium in Vladivostok, Russia. It is currently used mostly for football matches and is the home ground of FC Luch Vladivostok. The stadium is situated close to the main square and harbour and by one of the beaches of Vladivostok. The pitch has been improved and floodlights have been installed as well. The stadium holds 10,200.

References

External links
 Stadium picture

Football venues in Russia
FC Luch Vladivostok
Multi-purpose stadiums in Russia
Buildings and structures in Vladivostok
Dynamo sports society
Sport in Vladivostok